DZTV may refer to the 2 flagship stations of Intercontinental Broadcasting Corporation both licensed on Metro Manila, Philippines

 DZTV-TV, a television station (VHF Channel 13)
 DZTV-AM, a radio station (1386 AM)